Gavin Alexander Dein is a British entrepreneur and philanthropist, best known for his founding of the Reward Insight business. In November 2020 Verisk, a Nasdaq-listed data analytics company, purchased a strategic minority stake in Reward Insight in a deal worth over £100m

Early life
Gavin Dein is the son of David Dein MBE and Barbara Dein. David Dein is best known for co-owning Arsenal Football Club and founding the Premier League Gavin has an older brother Darren, who is a football agent operating in Europe and a younger sister Sasha. Gavin attended Haberdashers' Aske's Boys' School, The American School in London and graduated with honours in entrepreneurship at Babson College in Boston, Massachusetts.

Business
Dein founded the company Reward in 2001, a loyalty programme and platform management company.

Dein rolled out numerous loyalty schemes for football clubs. The company grew and launched loyalty programmes focusing on different industries, including motion pictures, music and other sports. In 2006 Dein developed a new technology to track and reward programme member shopping without the need for a loyalty card called Cardless Reward Technology (CRT).

The technology links consumers credit and debit cards to offers and deals, so while making their purchases customers can receive rewards such as discounts or free gifts without showing coupons or a separate loyalty card. In 2007 the innovation was nominated for the Best Industry Innovation of the Year at that years Credit Card Awards, and in 2008 Dein was accorded the Young Gun award by Growing Business for his invention. In addition to this programme, Reward also administers and runs the Barclaycard football credit card. Then in 2012 Reward launched the NatWest CashbackPlus rewards programme, which provides personalised rewards for NatWest debit card holders. In 2014 CashbackPlus won Best Card Benefits Programme of the Year.

Cashback Plus was renamed MyRewards in 2015  and was finalist for Best Benefits or Loyalty Programme of the Year 2016, winner in 2017, finalist in 2018 and winner of Best Credit Card Product of the Year in 2018 

Reward has offices in Mayfair, Central London and Belfast, Northern Ireland

Reward in 2012 was the largest sports loyalty programme operator in Europe.

Dein was a Non Executive Director of IE MUSIC, a talent representation business from 2016-2018. Clients include Robbie Williams, Ayda Field, Cher Lloyd, Craig Armstrong, Lemar, Lily Allen, Passenger and many more.

Personal life
Dein married Claire Guerlain in 2014. The couple have two children a boy and a girl and currently live in Mayfair, London.

Dein has been involved with the NSPCC since 2012 chairing several boards including the Childline School Service, National Development Board and is currently a member of the Income Generation Committee.

References

British businesspeople
Living people
National Society for the Prevention of Cruelty to Children people
Year of birth missing (living people)